Wilford Benjamin Garnaas (October 8, 1921 – May 9, 2002) was an American football player who played three seasons with the Pittsburgh Steelers of the National Football League (NFL). He attended Marshall High School in Minneapolis, Minnesota and played college football at the University of Minnesota.  He was an All-American in 1941.
He was drafted by the Chicago Cardinals as an offensive back in the sixth round of the 1944 NFL Draft.

In three years as a Steeler, Bill was a backup quarterback, receiver and returned kicks. Garnaas is featured on a 1948 Bowman Football Card.

References

External links
Just Sports Stats

1921 births
2002 deaths
Players of American football from Wyoming
American football quarterbacks
Minnesota Golden Gophers football players
Pittsburgh Steelers players
Sportspeople from Cheyenne, Wyoming